Dobrosav Krstić (5 February 1932 – 3 May 2015) was a Yugoslav and Serbian football manager and player.

Career
Krstić played with Vojvodina for over a decade (1951–1962), collecting 194 appearances and scoring 23 goals in the Yugoslav First League. He subsequently moved abroad to France and joined Sochaux, spending the next four seasons at the club. After a brief spell at Rouen, Krstić retired from the game.

At international level, Krstić was capped 30 times for Yugoslavia between 1955 and 1960, while scoring once. He was a member of the team that won the silver medal at the 1956 Summer Olympics, but also represented the country at the 1958 FIFA World Cup.

After hanging up his boots, Krstić served as manager of Sochaux from 1967 to 1969.

Honours
Yugoslavia
 Olympic Games: Silver Medal 1956

References

External links
 
 
 
 

1958 FIFA World Cup players
Association football defenders
Expatriate football managers in France
Expatriate footballers in France
FC Rouen players
FC Sochaux-Montbéliard managers
FC Sochaux-Montbéliard players
FK Vojvodina players
Footballers at the 1956 Summer Olympics
Ligue 1 players
Ligue 2 players
Medalists at the 1956 Summer Olympics
Olympic footballers of Yugoslavia
Olympic medalists in football
Olympic silver medalists for Yugoslavia
Serbian football managers
Serbian footballers
Footballers from Novi Sad
Yugoslav expatriate footballers
Yugoslav expatriates in France
Yugoslav First League players
Yugoslav football managers
Yugoslav footballers
Yugoslavia international footballers
1932 births
2015 deaths